Chepauk is the legislative assembly, that includes the city, Chepauk. Chepauk assembly constituency was part of Chennai Central (Lok Sabha constituency). Post constituency delimitation of 2008, this constituency is merged into the newly formed Chepauk-Thiruvallikeni (State Assembly Constituency).

The constituency is famous among people of Tamil Nadu as five time Chief Minister of Tamil Nadu, Kalaignar Karunanidhi contested thrice and won all three times from this Chepauk Assembly Constituency

Members of the Legislative Assembly

Election results

2006

2001

1996

1991

1989

1984

1980

1977

References

External links 
 

Former assembly constituencies of Tamil Nadu
Constituencies established in 1977
1977 establishments in Tamil Nadu
Constituencies disestablished in 2011
2011 disestablishments in India